North Brookfield is the name of some places in the United States:

North Brookfield, Massachusetts, a New England town
North Brookfield (CDP), Massachusetts, the main village in the town
North Brookfield, New York, a hamlet